Half a Hero is a 1953 American comedy film starring Red Skelton and Jean Hagen. Directed by Don Weis, the film was written by Max Shulman and released by Metro-Goldwyn-Mayer.

Plot
Freelance writer Ben Dobson (Skelton) lands his first full-time writing job at a national magazine, tasked with rewriting other authors' work.  His wife Martha (Hagen) uses this as the perfect time to start their family, and four years later pressures Ben into moving from New York City to the suburbs, where he's swiftly living beyond his means.  His boss then wants him to write a story on those suburbs, titled "slums of tomorrow."

Martha happily embraces her new environment and friendly neighbors, but Ben is cynical about their life there and decides they should return to the city.  However, while showing their home to another prospective buyer, Ben realizes he would miss the home's personal touches, and they should stay.

Cast
 Red Skelton as Ben Dobson
 Jean Hagen as Martha Dobson
 Charles Dingle as Mr. Bascomb
 Willard Waterman as Charles McEstway
 Mary Wickes as Mrs. Watts
 Frank Cady as Mr. Watts
 Hugh Corcoran as Pete Dobson
 Dorothy Patrick as Edna Radwell
 King Donovan as Sam Radwell
 Billie Bird as Ernestine
 Dabbs Greer as George Payson
 Kathleen Freeman as Welcomer
 Polly Bergen as herself

Reception
According to MGM records the film earned $661,000 in the US and Canada and $230,000 elsewhere, resulting in a profit of $68,000.

References

External links

1953 films
1953 comedy films
American black-and-white films
American comedy films
Films directed by Don Weis
Metro-Goldwyn-Mayer films
Films scored by Paul Sawtell
1950s English-language films
1950s American films